Pleuronematida is an order of predominantly free-living ciliates in the subclass Scuticociliatia.

References

External links 
 

 Pleuronematida at the World Register of Marine Species (WoRMS)

Ciliate orders